= Edgar, Virginia =

Unincorporated community in Virginia, United States

Coordinates: 37°51′12″N 77°17′48″W

Edgar is an unincorporated community in Caroline County, in the U.S. state of Virginia.
